The Men's individual pursuit events at the 2011 UCI Para-cycling Track World Championships was held on March 11 and 12.

Medalists

Results

C1

C1 - locomotor disability: Neurological, or amputation

Qualifying

Finals

C2

C2 - locomotor disability: Neurological, decrease in muscle strength, or amputation

Qualifying

Finals

C3

C3 - locomotor disability: Neurological, or amputation

Qualifying

Finals

C4

C4 - locomotor disability: Neurological, or amputation

Qualifying

Finals

C5

C5 - locomotor disability: Neurological, or amputation

Qualifying

Finals

Tandem B

Tandem B - visual impairment

Qualifying

Finals

See also
2011 UCI Track Cycling World Championships – Men's individual pursuit

References

2011 UCI Para-cycling Track World Championships